2016 is the natural number following 2015 and preceding 2017.

In mathematics
 2016 is a triangular number, being 1 + 2 + 3 + ... + 63. Equivalently, .
 2016 is a 24-gonal number  and a generalized 28-gonal (icosioctagonal) number .
 2016 has 36 divisors. 
 211 − 25 = 2016.
The number 360 itself is a highly composite number, while 2016, while not highly composite, is highly composite among the positive integers not divisible by five.
 2016 × 2 + 1 = 4033. Although 4033 is not prime, as 4033 = 37 × 109, it is a strong pseudoprime to base 2 . Aside from 2016, the only other numbers below 10,000 with this property are 1023, 1638, 2340, 4160, and 7920.
 There are 2016 five-cubes in a nine-cube. 
 2016 is an Erdős–Nicolas number  because, while not perfect, 2016 is the sum of its first 31 divisors (up to and including 288).
 2016 × 20 = 40,320 =  (read as "8 factorial"). 
  is prime. Since 2017 is similarly prime, 201617 + 1 is a semiprime.

In other fields

 2016 is the number of blocks that occur approximately every two weeks in Bitcoin before a difficulty adjustment is made.

References

Integers